Trossachs is a hamlet in the Canadian province of Saskatchewan.

Demographics 

References

Brokenshell No. 68, Saskatchewan
Designated places in Saskatchewan
Organized hamlets in Saskatchewan
Division No. 2, Saskatchewan